The 1925 New Brunswick general election was held on 10 August 1925, to elect 48 members to the 36th New Brunswick Legislative Assembly, the governing house of the province of New Brunswick, Canada. Although political parties had no standing in law, thirty-seven MLAs declared themselves to be Conservatives, and eleven declared themselves to be Liberals resulting in the defeat of the government of Peter Veniot.

References

Further reading
 
 

1925 elections in Canada
Elections in New Brunswick
1925 in New Brunswick
August 1925 events